The 1984 Wyoming Cowboys football team represented the University of Wyoming as a member of the Western Athletic Conference (WAC) during the 1984 NCAA Division I-A football season. Led by fourth-year head coach Al Kincaid, the Cowboys compiled a record of 6–6 overall and 4–4 in conference play, placing sixth in the WAC. The team played home games at War Memorial Stadium in Laramie, Wyoming. 

Jay Novacek was in his senior season with the Cowboys. He finished his Cowboys career with 83 career receptions for 1,536 yards and 10 touchdowns as a tight end.

Schedule

Awards and honors
 Jay Novacek, Kodak All-American football team
 Jay Novacek, NCAA record for receiving yards per receptions by a tight end.
 Kevin Lowe, NCAA record for highest rushing yards per attempt in a game (min. 10 att.) November 10, 1984 against South Dakota State

Team players in the NFL
The following were selected in the 1985 NFL Draft.

References

Wyoming
Wyoming Cowboys football seasons
Wyoming Cowboys football